Lucas Arnold and Mariano Hood were the defending champions but only Hood competed that year with Sebastián Prieto.

Gastón Etlis and Martín Rodríguez won in the final 7–5, 7–6(7–5) against Feliciano López and Marc López.

Seeds
Champion seeds are indicated in bold text while text in italics indicates the round in which those seeds were eliminated.

  Gastón Etlis /  Martín Rodríguez (champions)
  Mariano Hood /  Sebastián Prieto (first round)
  Julian Knowle /  André Sá (first round)
  Paul Hanley /  Harel Levy (first round)

Draw

External links
 Qualifying draw

Doubles